Pro is an abbreviation meaning "professional".

Pro, PRO or variants thereof may also refer to:

People 
 Miguel Pro (1891–1927), Mexican priest
 Pro Hart (1928–2006), Australian painter
 Mlungisi Mdluli (born 1980), South African retired footballer
 Derek Minor (PRo; born 1984), hip-hop singer
 Mike Awesome (1965–2007), a.k.a. The Pro, American wrestler Michael Lee Alfonso 
 Pro Wells, American football player

Occupations
 Prostitute, slang abbreviation
 Public relations officer

Linguistics 
 PRO (linguistics) ("big PRO")
 pro (linguistics) ("little pro")

Political parties
 , (Progressive Party), Chile
  (Republican Proposal), Argentina
  (Party for a Rule of Law Offensive), former German party

Organizations
 , the Swedish National Pensioners’ Organisation
 Performance rights organisation
 Producer Responsibility Organisation
 Professional Referee Organization, for North American soccer
 Provincial Research Organization, Canadian initiatives
 Public.Resource.Org, public domain publisher

Science and technology
 PRO (category theory), in mathematics
 .pro, a top-level Internet domain
 pro-, a prefix used in taxonomy
 Patient-reported outcome, in clinical trials
 Pressure-retarded osmosis
 Pro (or P), an abbreviation for proline, an amino acid
 Protein Ontology, a Protein Information Resource database

Entertainment
 Pasadena Roof Orchestra, England
 The Pro (TV series), with Rob Lowe
 The Pro (comics)

Other uses
 SIG Pro, a pistol series
 Public Record Office, UK
 Pro TV, Romania

See also